The Artillery Park (also known as the Churchyard Cemetery and Historical Cemetery 2) is an historic cemetery at North Road and Narragansett Avenue in Jamestown, Rhode Island.  It is located at a high point on the southern part of Conanicut Island.  It was originally laid out in 1656 as a burying ground and militia training ground, but appears to have been used as a burying ground only since the 1740s.  When British forces occupied the island in 1776, there was a brief skirmish there, and the British afterward used the area as a military staging ground.  The cemetery was listed on the National Register of Historic Places in 1973.

See also
 National Register of Historic Places listings in Newport County, Rhode Island
 List of cemeteries in Rhode Island

References

External links
 Jamestown Philomenian Library – Historic and Architectural Resources of Jamestown, Rhode Island
 

Cemeteries on the National Register of Historic Places in Rhode Island
1656 establishments in Rhode Island
Jamestown, Rhode Island
National Register of Historic Places in Newport County, Rhode Island